2-hydroxyhexa-2,4-dienoate hydratase (tesE (gene), hsaE (gene)) is an enzyme with systematic name 4-hydroxy-2-oxohexanoate hydro-lyase ((2Z,4Z)-2-hydroxyhexa-2,4-dienoate-forming). This enzyme catalyses the following chemical reaction

 4-hydroxy-2-oxohexanoate  (2Z,4Z)-2-hydroxyhexa-2,4-dienoate + H2O

This enzyme catalyses a late step in the bacterial steroid degradation pathway.

References

External links 
 

EC 4.2.1